The 23rd National Television Awards were held at The O2 Arena on 23 January 2018. The awards were hosted by Dermot O'Leary. This is the first time (since 2005) that National Television Awards had aired on a Tuesday, not Wednesday. Georgia Toffolo replaced Scarlett Moffatt as backstage presenter.

Performances
Piers Morgan (replacing Dermot O'Leary in the opening sequence)
Rak-Su
Seal

Awards

Programmes with multiple nominations

References

External links
The National Television Awards official website
The O2 official website

National Television Awards
N
2018 in British television
N
National
National Television Awards